Manilkara zapota, commonly known as sapodilla, sapote, chicozapote, chico, chicle, naseberry, or nispero, among other names, is a long-lived, evergreen tree native to southern Mexico, Central America and the Caribbean. An example natural occurrence is in coastal Yucatán in the Petenes mangroves ecoregion, where it is a subdominant plant species. It was introduced to the Philippines during Spanish colonization. It is grown in large quantities in Mexico and in tropical Asia including India, Pakistan, Thailand, Malaysia, Cambodia, Indonesia, Vietnam, Bangladesh.

The specific epithet zapota is from the Spanish  , which ultimately derives from the Nahuatl word tzapotl.

Description

It is wind-resistant and the bark is rich in a white, gummy latex called chicle. The ornamental leaves are medium green and glossy. The white flowers are inconspicuous and bell-like, with a six-lobed corolla. An unripe fruit has a firm outer skin and when picked, releases white chicle from its stem. A fully ripened fruit has saggy skin and does not release chicle when picked.

The fruit is a large berry,  in diameter. Inside, its flesh ranges from a pale yellow to an earthy brown color with a grainy texture akin to that of a well-ripened pear. Each fruit contains one to six seeds. The seeds are hard, glossy, and black, resembling beans, with a hook at one end that can catch in the throat if swallowed.

The fruit has an exceptionally sweet, malty flavor. The unripe fruit is hard to the touch and contains high amounts of saponin, which has astringent properties similar to tannin, drying out the mouth.

The trees can survive only in warm, typically tropical environments, dying easily if the temperature drops below freezing. From germination, the sapodilla tree will usually take anywhere from five to eight years to bear fruit. The sapodilla trees yield fruit twice a year, though flowering may continue year round.

Other names

Most of the common names of Manilkara zapota like "sapodilla" and "chicozapote" come from Spanish meaning "little sapote". Other common names in English for Manilkara zapota include bully tree, sawo, and marmalade plum.

Biological studies

Compounds extracted from the leaves showed anti-diabetic, antioxidant and hypocholesterolemic (cholesterol-lowering) effects in rats.

Acetone extracts of the seeds exhibited in vitro antibacterial effects against strains of Pseudomonas oleovorans and Vibrio cholerae.

Synonyms
Synonyms of this species include:

Uses
The fruit is edible and a favorite in the tropical Americas. Chicle from the bark is used to make chewing gum.

See also
 Sapote

References

External links
 CRFG Publications: Sapodilla
 Sapodilla – Fruits of Warm Climates – Julia F. Morton

zapota
Flora of Mexico
Flora of Belize
Flora of Guatemala
Crops originating from indigenous Americans
Tropical fruit
Saponaceous plants
Plants described in 1753
Taxa named by Carl Linnaeus